In mathematics, especially convex analysis, the recession cone of a set  is a cone containing all vectors such that  recedes in that direction.  That is, the set extends outward in all the directions given by the recession cone.

Mathematical definition 
Given a nonempty set  for some vector space , then the recession cone  is given by

If  is additionally a convex set then the recession cone can equivalently be defined by

If  is a nonempty closed convex set then the recession cone can equivalently be defined as
 for any choice of

Properties 
 If  is a nonempty set then .
 If  is a nonempty convex set then  is a convex cone.
 If  is a nonempty closed convex subset of a finite-dimensional Hausdorff space (e.g. ), then  if and only if  is bounded.
 If  is a nonempty set then  where the sum denotes Minkowski addition.

Relation to asymptotic cone 
 

By the definition it can easily be shown that 

In a finite-dimensional space, then it can be shown that  if  is nonempty, closed and convex.  In infinite-dimensional spaces, then the relation between asymptotic cones and recession cones is more complicated, with properties for their equivalence summarized in.

Sum of closed sets 
  Let nonempty closed convex sets  such that for any  then , then  is closed.

See also 
 Barrier cone

References 

Convex analysis